James Watson (born 16 April 1970 in Glasgow, Scotland, UK) is a British film and television actor.

He trained at the Drama Studio London and at the Focus Theatre Studio, Dublin. Started his acting career playing Dr. John McEwan in the Irish television soap opera Fair City in 1988. His most important role yet may be that of the swordmaster Duncan Idaho in the American TV miniseries Frank Herbert's Dune in 2000.

He founded the Actor's Bothy at the CCA and co-founded Celtic Mouse Productions (Ireland). He has produced five short films, two of which were short listed for Oscar consideration. Directing credits include Sixteen Words for Water (nominated for an Irish Times Theatre Award), "Breathe" (short film) and "The Playboy Interviews" (art installation film for the Douglas Hyde Gallery, Dublin).

Early life

Filmography
 Fair City (1988), Dr John McEwan - TV Series
 Before I Sleep (1997), patient
 Biological Maintenance Department (1997), Jim
 The Mystic Knights of Tir Na Nog (1998), Tidgh
 Blind Date (1999), Brien
 Ratcatcher (1999), Bus Driver
 Frank Herbert's Dune (2000), Duncan Idaho
 The Hawk & the Dove (2001), Michael
 If Silence Should End (2002), Malcolm
 King Jamie and the Angel (2002), soldier
 Prince William (2002), Sqiggy Clavell - TV
 The Winter Warrior (2002), Fingal
 The Bone Hunter (2003), Fingal
 Red Rose (2004), Lewars
 Summer Solstice (2005), Dominic
 A Woman in Winter (2005), taxi driver
 Take 3 Girls (2006), bouncer
 Book of Blood (2008), Jimmy - Matador
 Last Hand (2008), One - BBC
 Life of Riley (2008), bus driver - BBC
 My Family (2008), police sergeant - BBC
 Happy Holidays (2009), groom - F'n'G
 River City (2009), Alain - BBC

Theatre 
 Gagarin Way (2007), Gary
 What Every Woman Knows (2007), David
 The Black Water (2008), Martin
 Red Diesel (2008), Chris - reading
 LIFE as Duggie
 Sticks and Stones, Jordon Doyle
 Writers in Progress II, Various
 MacGregor, Argyll
 Trainspotting, Renton
 Mysteries 2000, Jesus
 Europe, Morocco
 Making Love to Yorick, Man
 Dark Places, Brian
 Trade me a Dream, O'Neill

Producer 
 The Last (2002) (producer)
 A Dublin Story (2003) (executive producer)
 Martin (2003) (producer)
 Luka (2004) (producer)
 Push Hands (2004) (executive producer)

References

External links
 Spotlight James Watson Page

 http://www.jameswatson.co.uk

Scottish male film actors
Scottish male stage actors
Scottish male television actors
Male actors from Glasgow
1970 births
Living people
Alumni of the Drama Studio London